Tadeusz Piotrowski (September 19, 1939 – July 10, 1986) was a Polish mountaineer and author of several books related to the subject. He has been referred to as "perhaps the finest winter mountaineer of his day".

Career

Piotrowski began his career in the 1960s in Poland's Tatra Mountains, around the time when he was a student at the Szczecin University of Technology. He would go on to become one of the leading Polish mountaineers, known worldwide as a winter climbing specialist. He was one of the earliest mountaineers to specialize in winter climbing.

His best known climbs, usually first along the given path, and most of them in winter, include: Trollryggen, Norway in winter 1972, Noshaq, Afghanistan in winter 1973, Trollryggen, Norway in winter 1974, Trollryggen, Norway in winter 1977, Tirich Mir, Pakistan in 1978, Rakaposhi, Pakistan in 1979, Distaghil Sar, Pakistan in 1980, Api, Nepal in winter 1983 and K2 in China/Pakistan in summer 1986.

In 1974, his climbing companion, Stanisław Latałło, died on Lhotse; whether Piotrowski could have helped him caused some controversy among Polish mountaineers. In 1983, Piotrowski directed the winter ascent on Api (7132 meters above sea level), and reached its peak on Christmas Eve. He was accompanied by Andrzej Bieluń, who climbed at the head, and was lost, assumed dead near the top of the mountain.

Piotrowski died on 10 July 1986. Two days previously he and Jerzy Kukuczka had finished the first ascent of the South Face of K2 (also called the "Polish Line") - a very difficult and dangerous route which was threatened by seracs and had been called "suicidal" by Reinhold Messner.  "The route is so avalanche-prone, that no one else has ever considered a new attempt." It was during the descent by a classic route (the Abruzzi Spur) that he lost both his crampons and fell to his death at around 7900 meters, following two exhausting stopovers at the wall with no food or water. The route Piotrowski and Kukuczka climbed remains unrepeated.

For his mountaineering successes, Tadeusz Piotrowski became a four-time recipient of the highest sports medal in Poland, the Gold Medal for the Exceptional Sporting Achievements.

See also
1986 K2 Disaster

Notes
a  In 1993 a Canadian team (Barry Blanchard, Troy Kirwan and Peter Arbic) made a partial repeat, but exited onto the Abruzzi Spur at a lower point than the Poles had done, and did not reach the summit.

References
Inline

General
 Rogozinska, Monika (translated by "Scrivanek")."K2/Chogori Winter 2003", Rzeczpospolita, undated, retrieved 2008-09-18.
 "Mountaineering: K2 Was Too Much", Warsaw Voice, 13 March 2003, retrieved 2008-09-18.

Bibliography
 Gdy krzepnie rtęć 1982; 
 Naga Góra – Nanga Parbat 1990; 
 Słońce nad Tiricz Mirem 1988; 
 Viharban, fagyban 1988 
 W burzy i mrozie 1977
 W lodowym świecie Trolli 1986; 
 W Ścianie Trolli 1984; 

1939 births
1986 deaths
Mountaineering deaths on K2
Polish mountain climbers
Polish male writers
Szczecin University of Technology alumni
People from Volyn Oblast